Izraʾ is a town in the Daraa Governorate of Syria, to the north of the city of Daraa. It is the administrative centre of the Izra' District, and sits at an altitude of 599 metres. Izra' had a population of 19,158 in 2004, according to the Syria Central Bureau of Statistics (CBS).

History

Izraa (Zorava, Zorowa or Zorabene) was a Canaanite city mentioned in the Bible. Located 80 km south of Damascus in the northern section of the Province of Daraa, its name appears in the Tell Amarna letters, documents which were exchanged between the Egyptian and Syrian rulers in 1334 B.C. Ancient inscriptions left by the Romans after their occupation of the Bashan area evidence the importance of the town.

An inscription found by the archaeologist Richter shows that the city was elevated to the rank of metrocomia (Great city) under the Emperor Severus Alexander (222-235 A.D.) and was known as Zorava.

Lejah (Trachonides or "the Rocky Land") forms a triangle with Borac as the northern apex, Izraa in the south-western corner and Shahba in the south-eastern corner.  In the course of history, this region was a natural fortress that invaders found very difficult to conquer. Herod's soldiers failed to occupy it. Even the Crusaders under Baldwin III could not subdue it, because of its difficult terrain, the lack of water and the resistance of its people.

The Christian Gospel reached this region early because of its proximity to the Holy Land. It became an episcopal seat during the Byzantine era, and ranked second after the metropolitan see of Bosra throughout the whole of the Province of Arabia.

In 1253 An-Nasir Yusuf ordered the roofing of the Friday  mosque in Izra.

The historian Ismail Abulfida described in his book Taqwim al Buldan that it was “to be one of the major capitals of Hauran, 18 miles from the region of Sanameine”.

Ottoman era
In 1596 Izra' appeared in the Ottoman tax registers as Madinat Zura''' and was part of the nahiya of Badi Sarma in the Qada of Hauran. It had a Christian population consisting of 175 households and 61 bachelors, and a Muslim population of 59 households and 30 bachelors. The villagers paid a fixed tax rate of 40% on various agricultural products, including wheat, barley, goats and/or beehives, in addition to on a water mill and jizya; a total of 124,120  akçe.

In 1840 the Egyptian governor Ibrahim Pasha took over the region and bombarded the church, causing great damage to the walls and dome, but failed to occupy the city.  During the Great Syrian Revolt against the French Mandate forces (1925-1926), Syrian rebels sought refuge in Izraa.

Demographics
The town had a population of 19,158 in 2004, according to the Syria Central Bureau of Statistics (CBS). The large majority of the inhabitants are Christians belonging to the Melkite Greek Catholic and Greek Orthodox churches alongside a significant Muslim minority. Izra contains two still-functional Byzantine-era churches, the Greek Orthodox St. George Church (locally referred to as “Khudr Izra”) and the Greek Catholic St. Elias Church. The former was built in 512 and is the oldest, functioning church in Syria.

Landscape
Izra can have very strong (vii) earthquakes (on average one every 50 years) with occurrences at 6-7 Richter. When a strong earthquake occurs, it will be difficult to stand and noticed by people driving motor cars. Furniture and glass will be broken. The damage will be negligible in buildings of good design and construction but considerable damage may be inflicted on poorly built or badly designed structures. There is a very high occurrence of periods with extreme drought.  Izra` has a semi-arid (0.2 - 0.5 p/pet) climate. The land area is totally cultivated, not much natural vegetation is left. The landscape is mostly covered with mosaic forest - shrubland/grassland. The climate is classified as a mid-latitude steppe (mid-latitude dry), with a subtropical desert scrub biozone. The soil in the area is high in leptosols (lp), a weakly developed shallow soil.

Climate
Izra has a cold semi-arid climate (Köppen climate classification: BSk''). Rainfall is higher in winter than in summer. About  of precipitation falls annually.

References

Bibliography

External links
Map of town, Google Maps
Ezra-map, 20M

Cities in Syria
Populated places in Izra' District
Melkite Christian communities in Syria